Lange Ruige Weide is a former municipality in the Dutch province of South Holland. It was located west of the city of Oudewater, and covered the hamlets of Langeweide and Ruigeweide.

Lange Ruige Weide was a separate municipality from 1818 to 1964, when it became part of Driebruggen.

References

External links
Map of the former municipality in 1868

Former municipalities of South Holland